Ytu ysypo is a species of myxophagan beetle in the genus Ytu. It was discovered in 1977.

References

Myxophaga
Beetles described in 1977